Below is a list of South East Australian Basketball League (SEABL) champions for both the men's and women's competitions. The men's competition ran from 1981 to 2018, while the women's competition ran from 1990 to 2018.

Men

The champions of the SEABL from 1981 to 1993 are historically identical to the ABA National Champions, due to the SEABL and the CBA/ABA being one in the same during that period. Over the league's first five seasons, the finals were contested between the top four teams at the end of the regular season. Conferences were first introduced in 1986. Between 1986 and 1993, the "conference champions" were the minor premiers (first in the regular season) of the South conference and East conference. The top four teams in each conference then competed for the league championship in the finals.

Following the CBA's introduction of a North conference from Queensland, there was no overall SEABL champion crowned between 1994 and 2007. Instead, both the South conference and East conference held individual finals series (either top six or top four format), with the two conference champions and a number of wildcards then competing in the National Finals against the North conference champion and a number of North conference wildcards. By 2001, the ABA had six affiliated conferences.

In 2008, an overall SEABL champion was crowned for the first time in 15 years when the South champion Hobart Chargers defeated the East champion Knox Raiders in a championship game that sent the winner into the ACC semi-finals. The format of South champion vs East champion in the SEABL Grand Final continued between 2009 and 2017. The conference system was scrapped by the SEABL in 2018, with a top eight finals structure taking its place.

Results by teams

Women

The SEABL women's competition was first introduced in 1990. In contrast to the large number of men's teams capable of filling two conferences, the women's competition fielded only a single conference from its inception until 2011. Much like the men's competition, the SEABL women's champions from 1990 to 1993 are historically identical to the ABA National Champions. From 1994 onward, the women's competition served as the South/East conference of the CBA/ABA. By 2001, the ABA had six affiliated men's conferences and five affiliated women's conferences.

In 2012, the women's competition was divided into two conferences for the first time due to five new women's teams having joined the SEABL since 2006—Brisbane (2007), Sandringham (2009), Hobart (2010), Geelong (2011) and Canberra (2012). Canberra's addition in 2012 expanded the league to 14 teams. The format of South champion vs East champion in the SEABL Grand Final occurred between 2012 and 2017. The conference system was scrapped by the SEABL in 2018, with a top eight finals structure taking its place.

Results by teams

See also

List of ABA National Champions

Notes

References

External links
SEBL Ladders 1981–1987
SEABL Ladders 1981–2007
SEABL champions 1981–2006
ABA National Champions 1981–1999
ABA National Champions 2002–2006
SEABL All-Time Award Winners (as of 2007)
1986 SEBL Finals

Champions
SEABL
Basketball in Australia lists